, son of regent Mitsuie, was a kugyō or Japanese court noble of the Muromachi period (1336–1573). He held a regent position kampaku from 1476 to 1479. Kujō Hisatsune was his son.

Family
 Father: Kujō Mitsuie
 Mother: Karahashi Aritoyo’s daughter
 Wives and Children:
 Wife: Jusanmi Tomoko
 Kujō Hisatsune
 Wife: Mushanakoji Takamitsu’s daughter
 Hosokawa Sumiyuki (1489-1507)
 unknown
 Jijiyuin
 son (1505-1564) adopted by Ashikaga Yoshitane
 son（?-1582）
 3 sons

References
 

1445 births
1516 deaths
Fujiwara clan
Kujō family